Auguste Meyer (22 December 1893 – 26 February 1984) was a French racing cyclist. He rode in the 1921 Tour de France.

References

1893 births
1984 deaths
French male cyclists
Place of birth missing